The 2006 Indian Super Cup was the 6th Indian Super Cup, an annual football match contested by the winners of the previous season's National Football League and Federation Cup competitions. However, since Mahindra United won both the 2005–06 National Football League and the 2005 Indian Federation Cup, the match was between Mahindra United and East Bengal (runner's up of the 2005–06 National Football League), with East Bengal winning 2–1 to clinch their second Super Cup title. The match was played at Cooperage Ground, Mumbai, on 27 May 2006.

Summary
Mahindra United had the best ever season in their history by winning the 2005–06 National Football League and the 2005 Federation Cup. The team coached by Derrick Pereira had been one of the consistent performers throughout the season, losing just 3 matches in the entire league. East Bengal on the other hand missed out on the National League title, finishing second by five points. Coached by Belgian manager Philippe De Ridder, East Bengal wanted to end the season on a high.

Mahindra United fielded a strong lineup, wanting to complete the hat-trick of trophies for the season with Yusif Yakubu and Jose Ramirez Barreto both starting upfront. However, Belgian coach Philippe De Ridder had made other plans as East Bengal dominated the proceedings and won the game by 2–1. Nigerian attacker Guy Ndem Herve opened the scoring with a header off Alvito D'Cunha's corner in the 23rd minute and just 10 minutes later, Alvito scored directly from the corner to put East Bengal two nil ahead. The defensive pairing of Guy Mertial and Muttah Suresh with Sashti Duley as right-back did their job perfectly to stop the dangerous duo of Yakubu and Barreto. Yakubu did reduce the margin in the second half but it was a mere consolation as East Bengal went on to lift their second Indian Super Cup title.

Match details

References

External links
9th "ONGC" Super Cup 2005/06

Indian Super Cup Finals
2005–06 in Indian football
East Bengal Club matches
Mahindra United FC matches